William Nairn (November 16, 1912 – May 12, 1986) was a Canadian football player who played for the Winnipeg Blue Bombers. He won the Grey Cup with them in 1939. He is a member of the Blue Bombers Hall of Fame and Manitoba Sports Hall of Fame. After his retirement from football he became an official in the WIFU. He died while playing golf in Winnipeg in 1986.

References

1912 births
1986 deaths
Winnipeg Blue Bombers players
Players of Canadian football from Manitoba
Canadian football people from Winnipeg